Virastyuk is a gender-neutral Ukrainian surname. Notable people with the surname include:

Roman Virastyuk (1968–2019), Ukrainian shot putter
Vasyl Virastyuk (born 1974), Ukrainian strength athlete, brother of Roman

Ukrainian-language surnames